Asian Kung-Fu Generation Presents: Nano–Mugen Compilation is a compilation album released by Asian Kung-Fu Generation on June 8, 2005, to advertise their fifth Nano-Mugen Festival that was held at Yokohama Arena on July 9. The album features one song from each of the eight total groups, composed of four Japanese bands and four UK bands, who performed at the event.

Track listing

Chart positions

Album

References

External links
 Nano-Mugen Fes. 2005 
 Nano-Mugen Fes. 2005 

Asian Kung-Fu Generation albums
2005 compilation albums